The European Film Award for Best Makeup and Hairstyling is one of the awards presented annually by the European Film Academy. The category was first presented in 2016 though prior to that, two makeup artists and hairstylists received nominations for the Award of Excellence, in 2007 and 2009.

Winners and nominees 
The winners are in a yellow background and in bold.

2000s

2010s

2020s

References

External links 
 Nominees and winners at the European Film Academy website

Best Sound Designer
Awards established in 2016
2016 establishments in Europe
Film awards for makeup and hairstyling